Haanja is a village in Estonia.

Haanja may also refer to:

Haanja Parish, Estonia
Haanja Upland, Estonia

See also